Roberto Alvim is a Brazilian theatre director. He was the founder and director of the Club Noir theatre in São Paulo from 2006 to 2019. Since June 18, 2019, he has served as head director of Ceacen, Center of Performing Arts, in the National Foundation of the Arts. On November 7, 2019 he was nominated Special Secretary for Culture under the auspices of the Ministry of Tourism, only to be fired on January 17, 2020, after plagiarizing a speech by German Nazi politician Joseph Goebbels in a government-sanctioned video.

Controversy

Fernanda Montenegro incident
In September 2019, there was push-back against his verbal attack against the actress Fernanda Montenegro. Roberto Alvim called her "dirty" and "liar" in a Facebook post.

Goebbels' speech

On 16 January 2020, while holding the office of Special Culture Secretary from the Ministry of Tourism, Alvim published a video on the Secretary's official Twitter account in which he paraphrases excerpts from a speech by Joseph Goebbels, Nazi Germany's Reichsminister of Propaganda. The fact that excerpts from Wagner's Lohengrin were used as the soundtrack for his video was taken by some commentators as an allusion to Nazism. The video soon after caused public uproar, and was deleted the following day. In response, Alvim posted a Facebook update in which he states he "hasn't cited anyone" and that the whole incident was a mere "rhetorical coincidence".

Following the public's reaction, on 17 January 2020, Alvim was fired. Addressing the controversy, president Jair Bolsonaro stated: "I repeat our rejection of totalitarian and genocidal ideologies, as well as any allusion to it". Regina Duarte was subsequently invited to be Special Secretary of Culture, succeeding Alvim, but she did not immediately accept the job.

Personal life
Alvim became a born-again Christian during a struggle with cancer.

References

1973 births
Living people
Brazilian theatre directors
Far-right politics in Brazil
Neo-Nazism in South America